The Velux 5 Oceans Race was a round-the-world single-handed yacht race, sailed in stages, managed by Clipper Ventures since 2000. Its most recent name comes from its main sponsor Velux. Originally known as the BOC Challenge, for the title sponsor BOC, the first edition was in 1982. In the late 1990s the race was renamed the Around Alone. After attracting just five entries in the 2010-11 race, the event has not been held since.

Overview 

The race was established in 1982 as the BOC Challenge, with main sponsorship from BOC. The race was inspired by the Golden Globe Race, which was the first single-handed round-the-world yacht race. Although the Golden Globe was a non-stop race, the BOC Challenge concept was for a single-handed round-the-world race, to be run in stages (in contrast to the Vendée Globe, which is non-stop).  As the longest single-handed event in the world, it was regarded as one of sailing's ultimate challenges.

The race was run every four years.  The first edition was won by Philippe Jeantot, who won all four legs of the race with an overall elapsed time of just over 159 days.  In 1990, the race was renamed the Around Alone; for 2006, it is known as the Velux 5 Oceans Race.

Past results

The BOC Challenge 1982–83 

Raced over four legs; Newport, Rhode Island — Cape Town — Sydney — Rio de Janeiro — Newport.  Two classes of boat were entered: Class 1, 45–56 feet (13.7–17.1 m); and Class 2, 32–44 feet (9.7–13.4 m).

Results:

The BOC Challenge 1986–87 

Raced over four legs; Newport, Rhode Island — Cape Town — Sydney — Rio de Janeiro — Newport.  Two classes of boat were entered: Class 1, 50–60 feet (15.2–18.3 m); and Class 2, 40–50 feet (12.2–15.2 m).  New safety rules were introduced for this race, including compulsory watertight bulkheads and a simple stability check.

Results:

The BOC Challenge 1990–91 

The course was changed for this edition, although it was still divided into four legs: Newport, Rhode Island — Cape Town — Sydney — Punta del Este — Newport.  Three classes of boat were entered: Class 1, 50–60 feet (15.2–18.3 m); Class 2, 40–50 feet (12.2–15.2 m); and a Corinthian class.

Results:

The BOC Challenge 1994–95 

The course was again changed for this edition, although it was still divided into four legs: Charleston, South Carolina — Cape Town — Sydney — Punta del Este — Charleston.  Two classes of boat were entered: Class 1, 50–60 feet (15.2–18.3 m); and Class 2, 40–50 feet (12.2–15.2 m).

Results:

The Around Alone, 1998 

The course was again changed for this edition, although it was still divided into four legs: Charleston, South Carolina — Cape Town — Auckland — Punta del Este — Charleston.  Two classes of boat were entered: Class 1, 50–60 feet (15.2–18.3 m); and Class 2, 40–50 feet (12.2–15.2 m).

The results:

Viktor Yazykov is noted for performing surgery alone, at sea, on his elbow to drain a dangerous infection after injuring his elbow during the race.  He emailed a doctor who provided instructions for his treatment

The Around Alone, 2002 

The course was again changed for this edition, this time spanning five legs: Newport, Rhode Island/New York — Brixham, Devon — Cape Town — Tauranga — Salvador, Brazil — Newport.  Although the race technically started and ended in Newport, it was preceded by a "prologue race", in which the boats with crews of up to five raced to New York, to take part in Sail for America, a major sailing event marking the first anniversary of the September 11, 2001 attacks.  The main Around Alone event started from New York, and finished back in Newport.

Three classes of boat were entered: Class 1, IMOCA Open 60; Class 2, IMOCA Open 50; and Class 3, IMOCA Open 40.

Results:

The Velux 5 Oceans 2006–07 

The 2006 edition covered a route of  nautical miles ( km). The race started in Bilbao (Spain), on October 22, 2006, and finished there. There were only two stops, in Fremantle (Australia) and Norfolk (USA).

The race was open to monohull yachts conforming to the Open 50 and Open 60 class criteria.  The Open classes are unrestricted in certain aspects but a box rule governs parameters such as overall length, draught, appendages and stability, as well as numerous other safety features.

The race took place in stages, with the skippers having the chance to rest and refit at each stop-over point.  Different staging points have been used over the years; the races prior to the 1998 event were run in four legs, and the 1998 event in five legs.  The 2006 edition had the longest stages of any edition to date, with just three legs:

The total length for the 2006 edition was 30,140 nautical miles (55,820 km).

The Velux 5 Oceans 2010–11 
The 2010 edition of the race started in La Rochelle (France), on October 17, 2010, and finished in the same port. Stopovers were Cape Town (South Africa), Wellington (New Zealand), Punta del Este (Uruguay), and Charleston, South Carolina (USA). The sailboats were all in the "Eco 60" class (Open 60 yachts built before 1 January 2003).

See also
Vendée Globe
Barcelona World Race
Route du Rhum
Volvo Ocean Race

Notes

Recurring sporting events established in 1982
Round-the-world sailing competitions
Single-handed sailing competitions
Yachting races